is a Japanese manga written and illustrated by Yuzo Takada. It was serialized in Weekly Manga Action for only three issues in 1991, with the three published stories later compiled in a single volume collection in December 1997. The story begins when genius inventor Kyusaku Natsume transplants the brain of a cat found by his son Ryunosuke on Christmas Eve, into a schoolgirl android that he created and subsequently stole from his former employer, Mishima Heavy Industries (owned by his estranged wife and Ryunosuke's mother, Akiko Natsume). The result, Nuku Nuku (also known as Atsuko Natsume), is a nekomusume or cat girl. The manga was licensed by ADV Manga and published as a single volume on August 24, 2004.

Cat Girl Nuku Nuku has been adapted into two OVA series and one anime television series. All three anime adaptations were also licensed in North America by ADV Films. An English language version of the OVA was released by Crusader Video in the United Kingdom on VHS featuring regional accents. Discotek Media has since received the license to the OVA, TV Series and its Dash!! spin-off.

Plot
The plot generally focuses on the custody battle for Ryunosuke and the attempts by Akiko and Mishima Heavy Industries to reclaim Nuku Nuku's body, which often involves amusingly larger-than-life battles between Nuku Nuku and military hardware produced by Mishima Heavy Industries.

Two episodes also deal with a one-sided war between Nuku Nuku and another android named Eimi, who suffers from an over-the-top inferiority complex and envies Nuku Nuku's more stable design. As it stands, Eimi was made after her and seeks to transfer her programming into Nuku Nuku to ditch her own body, which Akiko calls "a piece of junk". In spite of Eimi being more emotionally unstable than Nuku Nuku, both their fights end in a draw.

Characters
Atsuko 'Nuku Nuku' Natsume

Voiced by: Megumi Hayashibara (Japanese), Allison Keith (English)

The de facto protagonist and title character. Nuku Nuku started out as just a stray cat Ryunosuke stumbled upon taking a leak while on the run with his father Kyusaku after retrieving (stealing) a prototype android of Kyusaku's own design to keep it from being sold off to the military by Ryu's mother Akiko. The stray cat was shot in the crossfire short by Akiko's henchwomen quickly after Ryu was allowed to keep the cat as a Christmas present. In a moment of brilliance Kyusaku put the dying cat's brain into the android, giving the feline sapience and the android emotions. Nuku Nuku considers Ryu her brother and Akiko and Kyusaku her parents though she is fully aware of her origins. Nearly indestructible, she acts as Ryu's, and her own, bodyguard keeping from being reclaimed by the near dementedly overprotective Akiko. Relatively new to the world, Nuku Nuku acts childish at times, and is still easily distracted by stereotypical feline things like mice, but shows a sincere desire to evolve and grow. In spite of her situations, she harbors no ill will towards Akiko or just about anyone, but is more than willing to resort to violence when push comes to shove. To help create the pretense of a normal life she attends high school.

Ryunosuke Natsume

Voiced by: Kazue Ikura (Japanese), Kira Vincent-Davis (English)

The son of a brilliant if absent minded scientist and the over protective CEO of a Japan's number one weapon's manufacturer, Ryu manages to take it all in stride and enjoys the times where he's able to squeeze in a normal life and quality time with either of his parents. He loves Nuku Nuku as a sister, but is agitated when his father brushes off her blunders as 'just being a cat' when at the same time granting her the respect and responsibilities of a human being. Ryu was the one who found the stray cat that would eventually become Nuku Nuku. Ryu is fully aware of how warped his mother can be, but still cares for her all the same (but still prefers to live with his father over his mother's smothering affection).

Kyusaku Natsume

Voiced by: Akira Kamiya (Japanese), Andrew Klimko (English)

The brilliant, if quite eccentric, scientist who created a prototype android with funding from his wife's company. However, with the amount of cash being dumped into the project he realized that his android would be sold off as a weapon. Having no desire to aid his wife's weapon's research he fled with his son in tow. He and his wife are not technically divorced and will still chat and bicker like any married couple when the chance arises. He created add-ons for Nuku Nuku on at least one occasion to outfit her for unique situations.

Akiko Natsume

Voiced by: Saeko Shimazu (Japanese), Kelly Manison (English)

CEO of Japan's biggest military contractor, and an obsessively protective mother, Akiko's greatest goals are to reclaim Ryunosuke from her husband and to capture Nuku Nuku in order to reverse engineer her. Because of the delicate nature of the information about Nuku Nuku's existence she does not try to legally reclaim Ryu, but instead relies on numerous abduction attempts by her two henchwomen Arisa and Kyouko. In spite of her borderline-demented attitude and love of firepower, she does indeed love Ryunosuke and only wants what's best for him. That said, all else is business to her, and is frighteningly ruthless and manipulative to get what she wants and was even willing to turn a blind eye to Nuku Nuku when the cat girl was working at a restaurant her company owned.

Eimi Yoshikawa

Voiced by: Mika Kanai (Japanese), Cynthia Martinez (English)

An android built in the image of the deceased granddaughter of Kyusaku Natsume's mentor, Eimi is emotionally, mentally, and physically unstable. Built in the image of a girl around Ryu's age, Eimi's activation resulted in an explosion that killed her grandfather, leaving her legally the property of Akiko's company. Suffering from multiple sources of psychological trauma on top of (or maybe because of) her faulty design, Eimi's single fixation is taking Nuku Nuku's body for herself. (Eimi's own body doomed to detonate if pushed beyond its limit due a faulty or perhaps non-existent cooling system.) Eimi openly admits she has no idea how to download her OS into Nuku Nuku's hardware (not knowing Nuku Nuku's brain is biological and not software driven like Eimi's own), but is driven by a lack of a better plan and a superiority-inferiority complex she suffers from Nuku Nuku. Nuku Nuku for her part would love nothing more than to be Eimi's friend. Eimi admitted to having feelings for Ryu, but brushed off her own emotions as meaningless since like everything else about her is just a software parlor trick, and wrote an apology to Ryu for feeling such 'fake' emotions towards him. A drama queen and an irrepressible hot-head, Eimi is able to think ahead and be clever but often lets her own impatience get the better of her.

Arisa Sono and Kyouko Ariyoshi

Arisa voiced by: Aya Hisakawa (Japanese), Kaytha Coker (English)

Kyouko voiced by: Akiko Hiramatsu (Japanese), Tiffany Grant (English)

Akiko's two loyal henchwomen, they spearhead the attacks on Nuku Nuku and frequently suffer the consequences. Arisa is the more violent of the two and prefers to use weapons in order to get her way, something which Kyouko tries to restrain.

Media

Manga
The manga is published in English by ADV Manga. It was serialized in Weekly Manga Action. It was created by Yuzo Takada and originally contained three chapters which focused on Nuku Nuku trying to be a human after her brain was transferred into an android. The manga was licensed by ADV Manga and published as a single volume on August 24, 2004, with the name All Purpose Cultural Cat Girl Nuku Nuku.

Anime
Cat Girl Nuku Nuku has been adapted into two OVA series and one anime television series. The first OVA adaptation, All Purpose Cultural Cat Girl Nuku Nuku, was directed by Yoshio Ishiwata and released in Japan as six individual episodes on both VHS and Laserdisc from November 1992. A subtitled version of the OVA was released by A.D. Vision on May 9, 1995. Crusader Video released the OVA in the United Kingdom featuring regional accents. A scene possibly alluding to masturbation was removed prior to release.

Spanning fourteen episodes, the full anime adaptation, All Purpose Cultural Cat Girl Nuku Nuku TV, was directed by Yoshitaka Fujimoto. It premiered in Japan on January 7, 1998, and ran until March 25, 1998. It introduces new characters and makes several changes to the manga story line.

The third adaptation was a 12-episode OVA series called All Purpose Cultural Cat-Girl Nuku Nuku DASH! and also directed by Yoshitaka Fujimoto. It was released on DVD in three volumes from September 23, 1998, to December 23, 1998.

All three anime adaptations were originally licensed in North America by ADV Films. Discotek Media licensed the OVA, TV Series and its Dash!! spin-off for a single-disc SDBD release on August 28, 2018, which includes Crusader Video's dub of the OVA as an added bonus.

Reception
In his book Horror and Science Fiction Film IV, Donald C Willis referred to All Purpose Cultural Cat Girl Nuku Nuku, Volume 1 as "miscalculated to be another Urusei Yatsura [...] thought it has its moments." The review also noted that "The exaggerated emotions are less amusing than wearing."

Footnotes

References

External links

1992 anime OVAs
1993 anime OVAs
1993 manga
1998 anime television series debuts
1999 manga
ADV Films
Ashi Productions
Discotek Media
Futabasha manga
Kadokawa Shoten manga
Kemonomimi
Seinen manga
Shōnen manga